Douglas Jackson (born 1956) is a Scottish novelist. Jackson grew up in the town of Jedburgh in the Scottish Borders. A journalist on local and national newspapers for 36 years, Jackson left The Scotsman, where he was assistant editor, in 2009 to become a full-time writer.

Writing career
As of January 2015 he has published twelve novels, eight under the name Douglas Jackson and four under the pen name James Douglas. Jackson's first novel was Caligula (2008), the story of a young slave and animal trainer, Rufus, who becomes keeper of the famously mad Emperor's elephant, Bersheba. Rufus and his friend, the famous gladiator, Cupido, struggle to stay alive in the complex web of plot and counter plot in Caligula's court on the Palatine Hill.  This was followed in 2009 by Claudius, which continues Rufus's story as he accompanies another emperor on the invasion of Britain in 43 AD. In 2010, Hero of Rome, the first of a new series featuring the tribune Gaius Valerius Verrens, was published. It will be followed on 18 August 2011, by Defender of Rome. The third, Avenger of Rome was published in 2012, followed by  Sword of Rome (2013), Enemy of Rome (2014) and Scourge of Rome (2015). Jackson's first series, The Doomsday Testament (James Douglas), follows art recovery expert Jamie Saintclair as he tries to unravel the mystery behind his soldier grandfather's final mission of World War Two, a quest which brings him within a fingertip of the most famous painting still missing from the war, and a buried secret that could destroy the world or safeguard the future of mankind. Douglas Jackson's books are available as ebooks.

Bibliography

Rufus
 Caligula: The Tyranny of Rome (2008)
 Claudius (2009)

Gaius Valerius Verrens
 Hero of Rome (2010)
 Defender of Rome (2011)
 Avenger of Rome (2012)
 Sword of Rome (2013)
 Enemy of Rome (2014)
 Scourge of Rome (2015)
 Saviour of Rome (2016)
 Glory of Rome (2017)
 Hammer of Rome (2018)

Glen Savage mystery
 War Games (2014)
 Brothers in Arms (2019)

Other

Blood Roses (2019)

Jamie Saintclaire (as James Douglas)
 The Doomsday Testament (2011)
 The Isis Covenant (2012)
 The Excalibur Codex (2013)
 The Samurai Inheritance (2014)

References

External links 
 
 Douglas Jackson page at Fantastic Fiction

1956 births
Living people
Scottish novelists
People from Jedburgh
Writers of historical fiction set in antiquity